This is a list of the 50 states, the 5 territories, and the District of Columbia by population density, population size, and land area. It also includes a sortable table of density by states, territories, divisions, and regions by population rank and land area, and a sortable table for density by states, divisions, regions, and territories in square miles and square kilometers.

Population density is defined as the population per (divided by) land area. Resident population is from the 2020 census. Land area is from the 2010 Census.

The population density of the United States is lower than that of many other countries because of the United States' large land area. There are large, sparsely populated areas in parts of the US, like the east-to-west stretch extending from the outskirts of Seattle all the way to Minneapolis, or the north-to-south portion from Tacoma to San Francisco (excluding the presence of the cities of Portland and Spokane). For comparison, the population density of the U.S. is 1/15 that of South Korea and 1/12 that of India and the Netherlands. On the other hand, it is over 8 times higher than that of Canada and over 9 times higher than that of Australia.

2020 population density by jurisdiction

See also

 Demographics of the United States
 List of U.S. states by population
 List of United States cities by population density
 List of U.S. states by population growth rate
 List of U.S. states by historical population
 List of U.S. states by African-American population
 List of U.S. states by fertility rate

References

External links

United States states
Population density
United States demography-related lists
United States, population density